Nils Skutle (born August 16, 1953, in Odda) was the director of the Norwegian football club Rosenborg BK. He was also a member of the Norwegian interest organization Norsk Toppfotball until 2009.

References 

1953 births
Living people
People from Odda

Rosenborg BK non-playing staff
Norwegian sports executives and administrators